Anolis singularis, the Macaya green twig anole or porcupine anole, is a species of lizard in the family Dactyloidae. The species is found in Haiti and the Dominican Republic.

References

Anoles
Reptiles described in 1965
Reptiles of Haiti
Reptiles of the Dominican Republic
Taxa named by Ernest Edward Williams